Philippe Montandon (born 15 July 1982) is a retired footballer from Switzerland who played as defender.

External links
 football.ch profile
 

1982 births
Living people
Swiss men's footballers
Switzerland under-21 international footballers
Swiss expatriate footballers
Swiss expatriate sportspeople in Italy
FC Schaffhausen players
FC St. Gallen players
FC Winterthur players
FC Wil players
FC Lugano players
Swiss Super League players
Expatriate footballers in Italy
Association football defenders
People from Uster
Sportspeople from the canton of Zürich